The 2014 United States House of Representatives election in the United States Virgin Islands were held on Tuesday, November 4, 2014 to elect the non-voting Delegate to the United States House of Representatives from the United States Virgin Islands' at-large congressional district. The election coincided with the elections of other federal and state offices, including the election of the Virgin Islands' governor.

The non-voting delegate is elected for a two-year term. Donna Christian-Christensen, who represented the district from 1997 to 2015, did not run for re-election. She instead ran for governor.

Primary elections were held on August 2, 2014.

Democratic primary

Candidates

Declared
 Emmett Hansen, former Virgin Islands Senator and former Chairman of the Democratic Party of the Virgin Islands
 Shawn-Michael Malone, Virgin Islands Senator
 Stacey Plaskett, attorney, former Congressional staffer and candidate for the seat in 2012

Declined
 Donna Christian-Christensen, Delegate to the U.S. House of Representatives (ran for Governor)

Results

General election

Results

References

External links
Emmett Hansen
Stacey Plaskett

United States Virgin Islands
2014
2014 United States Virgin Islands elections